Francisco Javier González may refer to:

 Fran (footballer, born 1969), Spanish retired footballer
 Francisco González (footballer, born 1984), Mexican goalkeeper
 Francisco González (footballer, born 1988), Mexican midfielder
 Fran González (footballer, born 1989), Spanish footballer